Kent C. Berridge (born 1957) is an American academic, currently working as a professor of psychology (biopsychology) and neuroscience at the University of Michigan. Berridge was a joint winner of the 2018 Grawemeyer Award for Psychology.

Early life and education
Berridge was born in 1957. Berridge earned a Bachelor of Science from the University of California, Davis in 1979, followed by a PhD from the University of Pennsylvania in 1983.

Research
Berridge conducts research relating to brain systems of motivation, affect, reward “liking”, reward “wanting”, emotion, fear, pleasure, drug addiction, eating disorders, and decision utility. He also studies natural syntactical chains of behavior (e.g. grooming; taste response patterns) in animals with colleague Dr. J. Wayne Aldridge. With Dr. Piotr Winkielman, he has investigated the issue of unconscious emotion in humans.

Liking 
Berridge is known for his work on the brain systems for pleasure (“liking”). Using an assay for “liking” called Taste Reactivity Analysis developed by taste researchers, Berridge measures facial palatability responses to tastes, which are similar between rodents, primates and humans. When something enjoyably sweet is tasted, characteristic licking responses occur. When something aversively bitter is tasted, gaping and head shaking occur. Berridge has helped identify "hedonic hotspots" in the brain, such as the nucleus accumbens and ventral pallidum, where opioid, endocannabinoid, and GABA neurotransmission coordinate the “liking” of tastes. Berridge postulates that these hedonic hotspots may be crucial for how the brain produces the hedonic pleasurable feelings common to delicious food, sex, drugs, and other rewards (a role previously thought to be played mostly by brain dopamine systems).

Addiction 
Berridge and colleague Dr. Terry Robinson have formulated a contemporary theory of addiction called the Incentive Sensitization Theory of Addiction. According to this theory, drug addiction develops from a sensitization of the mesolimbic dopamine system. Dopamine normally functions to attribute incentive salience to stimuli associated with rewards like food and sex, and triggers reward “wanting”. Drugs hijack this “wanting” system. Following repeated use of drugs, the dopamine system becomes hyper-responsive and drug cues become hyper-salient. This means drug cues are nearly impossible for addicts to ignore, and when they are encountered they can lead to intense cravings and/or relapse. This sensitized cue-triggered drug 'wanting' can persist for years after an addict quits drugs, and long after drug withdrawal has ceased. This fact may account for the tendency of former addicts to relapse to drug use after quitting, sometimes even after many years of abstinence.

Dopamine 
Berridge and Robinson helped redefine the role of mesolimbic dopamine in the brain, which had previously been viewed as a pleasure neurotransmitter. Dopamine is no longer widely regarded as a pleasure transmitter. Instead, dopamine is thought to mediate reward, that is, to attribute incentive salience to reward-associated stimuli.

See also
 Dopamine
 Happiness
 Incentive salience
 Motivation
 Pleasure
 Reward system
 Substance dependence

References

American neuroscientists
21st-century American psychologists
Emotion psychologists
Living people
University of Michigan faculty
Writers on addiction
University of California, Davis alumni
1957 births
20th-century American psychologists